The following is a list of awards and nominations received by a Welsh actor Jonathan Pryce.

Pryce is known for his performances in film, television, and theatre. For his work on the London stage he received six Laurence Olivier Award nominations winning twice for his performances in the Shakespeare tragedy Hamlet in 1980 and the musical Miss Saigon in 1990. For his work on Broadway he received two Tony Award nominations and win for Best Featured Actor in a Play in the dramatic play Comedians in 1977, and Best Actor in a Musical for his performance in Miss Saigon in 1991.

He received his first Academy Award nomination for Best Actor for his portrayal of Pope Francis in the Fernando Meirelles drama The Two Popes (2019). He also received a Golden Globe Award, and British Academy Film Award nomination for his performance as well. For his work on television he received two Primetime Emmy Award nominations for Outstanding Supporting Actor in a Limited Series or Movie for his performances in Barbarians at the Gate (1993), and Return to Cranford (2010) as well as a Screen Actors Guild Award nomination for Outstanding Ensemble Cast in a Drama Series for Game of Thrones in 2019.

Major associations

Academy Awards

BAFTA Awards

Emmy Award

Golden Globe Awards

Olivier Award

Tony Awards

Screen Actors Guild Award

Other associations

Blockbuster Entertainment Awards

British Independent Film Awards

Cannes Film Festival

Critics' Choice Television Award

Drama Desk Award

Drama League Award

Evening Standard British Film Awards

Saturn Awards

References

External links
 

Pryce, Jonathan